In linguistics, periphrasis is the use of one or more function words to express meaning that otherwise may be expressed by attaching an affix or clitic to a word. The resulting phrase includes two or more collocated words instead of one inflected word. The word periphrasis originates from the Greek word periphrazein, which means talking around.

Periphrastic forms are a characteristic of analytic languages, whereas the absence of periphrasis is a characteristic of synthetic languages. While periphrasis concerns all categories of syntax, it is most visible with verb catena.  The verb catenae of English (verb phrases constructed with auxiliary verbs) are highly periphrastic.

Examples
The distinction between inflected and periphrastic forms is usually illustrated across distinct languages. However, comparative and superlative forms of adjectives (and adverbs) in English provide a straightforward illustration of the phenomenon. For many speakers, both the simple and periphrastic forms in the following table are possible:

The periphrastic forms are periphrastic by virtue of the appearance of more or most, and they therefore contain two words instead of just one. The words more and most contribute functional meaning only, just like the inflectional affixes -er and -est.

Across languages

English vs. Latin
Such distinctions occur in many languages. The following table provides some examples across Latin and English:

Periphrasis is a characteristic of analytic languages, which tend to avoid inflection. Even strongly inflected synthetic languages sometimes make use of periphrasis to fill out an inflectional paradigm that is missing certain forms. A comparison of some Latin forms of the verb dūcere 'lead' with their English translations illustrates further that English uses periphrasis in many instances where Latin uses inflection.

English often needs two or three verbs to express the same meaning that Latin expresses with a single verb. Latin is a relatively synthetic language; it expresses grammatical meaning using inflection, whereas the verb system of English, a Germanic language, is relatively analytic; it uses auxiliary verbs to express functional meaning.

Israeli Hebrew

Unlike Classical Hebrew, Israeli Hebrew uses a few periphrastic verbal constructions in specific circumstances, such as slang or military language. Consider the following pairs/triplets, in which the first are a Classical Hebrew synthetic form and the last are an Israeli Hebrew analytic periphrasis:

According to Ghil'ad Zuckermann, the Israeli periphrastic construction (using auxiliary verbs followed by a noun) is employed here for the desire to express swift action, and stems from Yiddish. He compares the Israeli periphrasis to the following Yiddish expressions all meaning "to have a look":

Zuckermann emphasizes that the Israeli periphrastic constructions "are not nonce, ad hoc lexical calques of Yiddish. The Israeli system is productive and the lexical realization often differs from that of Yiddish". He provides the following Israeli examples:

But while Zuckermann attempted to use these examples to claim that Israeli Hebrew grew similar to European languages, it will be noticed that all of these examples are from the slang and therefore linguistically marked. The normal and daily usage of the verb paradigm in Israeli modern Hebrew is of the synthetic form, as in Classical Hebrew:

Catenae
The correspondence in meaning across inflected forms and their periphrastic equivalents within the same language or across different languages leads to a basic question. Individual words are always constituents, but their periphrastic equivalents are often not. Given this mismatch in syntactic form, one can pose the following questions: how should the form-meaning correspondence across periphrastic and non-periphrastic forms be understood?; how does it come to pass that a specific meaning-bearing unit can be a constituent in one case but in another case, it is a combination of words that does not qualify as a constituent? An answer to this question that has recently come to light is expressed in terms of the catena unit, as implied above. The periphrastic word combinations are catenae even when they are not constituents, and individual words are also catenae. The form-meaning correspondence is therefore consistent. A given inflected one-word catena corresponds to a periphrastic multiple-word catena.

The role of catenae for the theory of periphrasis is illustrated with the trees that follow. The first example is across French and English. Future tense/time in French is often constructed with an inflected form, whereas English typically employs a periphrastic form, e.g.

Where French expresses future tense/time using the single (inflected) verb catena sera, English employs a periphrastic two-word catena, or perhaps a periphrastic four-word catena, to express the same basic meaning. The next example is across German and English:

German often indicates an object of a preposition with a single dative case pronoun. For English to express the same meaning, it usually employs the periphrastic two-word prepositional phrase with for. The following trees illustrate the periphrasis of light verb constructions:

Each time, the catena in green is the matrix predicate. Each of these predicates is a periphrastic form insofar as at least one function word is present. The b-predicates are, however, more periphrastic than the a-predicates since they contain more words. The closely similar meaning of these predicates across the a- and b-variants is accommodated in terms of catenae, since each predicate is a catena.

See also 
 Adposition
 Analytic language
 Compound verb
 Deflexion (linguistics)
 Dependency grammar

Citations

General references 
 Matthews, P. 1981. Syntax. Cambridge, UK: Cambridge University Press.
 Matthews, P. 1991. Morphology, 2nd edition. Cambridge, UK: Cambridge University Press.
 Osborne, T. and T. Groß 2012a. "Constructions are catenae: Construction Grammar meets Dependency Grammar". Cognitive Linguistics 23, 1, 163–214.
 Osborne, T., M. Putnam, and T. Groß 2012b. "Catenae: Introducing a novel unit of syntactic analysis". Syntax 15, 4, 354–396.
 Stump, G. 1998. "Inflection". In A. Spencer and A. M. Zwicky (eds.), The handbook of morphology. Oxford: Blackwell. pp. 13–43.

External links 
 Surrey periphrasis database

Linguistic morphology

an:Perifrasi verbal
br:Troadell (yezhoniezh)
cs:Perifráze
mk:Перифраза
sk:Perifráza